Towelhead may refer to:

 Towelhead, an ethnic slur for people of Arab descent especially those wearing Keffiyeh
 Towelhead (novel), a 2005 novel by Alicia Erian
 Towelhead (film), a 2007 film by Alan Ball based on the above novel